
Year 530 (DXXX) was a common year starting on Tuesday (link will display the full calendar) of the Julian calendar. In the Roman Empire, it was known as the Year of the Consulship of Lampadius and Probus (or, less frequently, year 1283 Ab urbe condita). The denomination 530 for this year has been used since the early medieval period, when the Anno Domini calendar era became the prevalent method in Europe for naming years.

Events 
 By place 

 Byzantine Empire 
 December 15 – Emperor Justinian I selects a second commission to excerpt and codify the writings of the jurists on Roman law. This becomes the Digest (Pandects).
 Tribonian becomes quaestor sacri palatii and chief editor of the compilation of the old Roman lawyers' writings.

 Persia 
 Spring – Battle of Dara: Belisarius and Hermogenes (magister officiorum) defeat a combined Persian-Arab army of 50,000 men at Dara (modern Turkey), by entrenching his infantry in a refused position in the centre line, then carrying out a cavalry envelopment to culminate a classic defensive-offensive battleplan.  
 Summer – Battle of Satala: A Byzantine cavalry force (30,000 men) under command of Sittas defeats a major Persian invasion into Roman Armenia. 

 Africa 
 King Hilderic is deposed by his cousin Gelimer after a seven-year reign. Gelimer restores Arianism as the official religion of the Vandal Kingdom and puts Hilderic in prison along with other supporters. 
 Justinian I sends an embassy to Carthage to negotiate with Gelimer. Gelimer replies: “Nothing is more desirable than that a monarch should mind his own business.”

 China 
 Emperor Xiao Zhuang Di is arrested and imprisoned in a Buddhist temple at Jinyang (Shanxi). He is succeeded by Chang Guang Wang, who becomes the new ruler of Northern Wei.
 Xiao Tong, eldest son of emperor Wu Di, compiles the Wen Xuan (Literary Selections), a famous anthology of works dating from the Han to the Liang Dynasty (approximate date).

 By topic 

 Art 
 The mosaic synagogue floor from Maon (Judea) is made. It is now kept at the Israel Museum in Jerusalem (approximate date).
 The Vishnu Temple at Deogarh, Uttar Pradesh (India) is built.

 Religion 
 September 22 – Pope Felix IV dies at Rome after a four-year reign, in which he has condemned semi-pelagianism. He is succeeded by Boniface II, an archdeacon of German descent, who becomes the 55th pope.
 October 14 – Dioscorus is elected as antipope in the Lateran Palace, but he dies within a month, thus ending the schism. 
 Brendan, Irish abbot, allegedly climbs to the top of Mount Brandon to look for the Americas (approximate date).

Births 
 Dallán Forgaill, Irish poet (approximate date)
 Sophia, Byzantine Empress (approximate date)
 Venantius Fortunatus, Latin poet and bishop (approximate date) (d. 600)
 Xuan Di, emperor of the Chen Dynasty (d. 582)

Deaths 
 September 22 – Pope Felix IV
 October 14 – Antipope Dioscorus
 Cador, king of Dumnonia (England)
 Colmán of Cloyne, Irish monk (d. 606)
 Drest III, king of the Picts (approximate date)
 Erzhu Rong, general of Northern Wei (b. 493) 
 Xiao Baoyin, prince of Southern Qi (b. 487)

References